The 28th Annual Nickelodeon Kids' Choice Awards was held on March 28, 2015, at the Forum in Inglewood, California, and hosted by Nick Jonas. The show was broadcast at 8:00 PM (ET/PT), produced by Nickelodeon Productions, with a simulcast in the United States also carried across sister networks TeenNick, Nicktoons and TV Land, along with the network's mobile apps and website. It was led into by a double episode of The Thundermans. There were 4 new categories this year. Voting took place in six continents on 19 localized websites, along with various simulcasts across the world, on either live or tape-delayed. Despite the simulcast, the show suffered a deep drop from the 2014 ceremony, attracting approximately 3,630,000 million total viewers for the original American airing, a drop of 27% from year to year. TV sitcom Austin & Ally swept the KCAs, taking home 3 blimps; the series is the second from Disney Channel to win favorite kids show in KCA history.

The premiere of a new animated series, Harvey Beaks, aired after the telecast.

Presenters and performers and stunts

Host
 Nick Jonas

Musical performers
 Nick Jonas – "Chains", "Jealous"
 Iggy Azalea feat. Jennifer Hudson - "Trouble"
 5 Seconds of Summer - "What I Like About You"

Presenters
 Jamie Foxx
 Zendaya
 Kevin James
 Meghan Trainor
 Nick Cannon
 Debby Ryan
 Quvenzhané Wallis
 Echosmith
 Kaley Cuoco-Sweeting
 Tia Mowry
 Joe Jonas
 Breanna Yde
 Benjamin Flores, Jr.
 Josh Peck
 Adam Sandler
 Josh Gad
 Grant Gustin
 Chloe Bennet
 Bethany Mota
 Shawn Mendes
 Skylar Diggins
 Mo'ne Davis
 Jennette McCurdy
 Jennifer Lopez
 Chris Pratt

Winners and nominees
 The nominees were announced on February 20, 2015.
 Winners are listed first, in bold. Other nominees are in alphabetical order.

Movies

Television

Music

Miscellaneous

International awards

Africa
The nominations were announced on February 23, with the event airing on April 1.

Favorite Radio DJ (South Africa)
 Bonang Matheba
 Roger Goode
 Darren Simpson
 Poppy Ntshongwana

Favorite On-Air Personality (Nigeria)
 The Big Tyme
 Mannie
 Gbemi
 Tosyn Bucknor

Australia and New Zealand
The nominations were revealed on February 24, with the American ceremony airing live with the Australian awards announced during continuity.

Favorite Internet Sensation
 Jamie’s World
 Charli’s Crafty Kitchen
 Troye Sivan
 Sarah Ellen
 DieselD199

Favorite Sports Star
 Steve Smith
 Stephanie Gilmore
 Nick Kyrgios
 Dan Carter
 Sarah Walker

Favorite Music Act
 5 Seconds of Summer
 Sheppard
 Lorde
 Jamie McDell
 Iggy Azalea

Favorite Animal
 Grumpy Cat
 Dr. Colosso
 Boo the Pomeranian
 Meredith Grey and Olivia Benson
 Munchkin the Teddy Bear

Favorite Fan Army
 KATY CATS
 5SOSFAM
 Arianators
 Directioners
 Swifties

Brazil

Favorite Artist
 Anitta
 Luan Santana
 MC Gui
 Lucas Lucco

France

Favorite Musical Artist
 Kendji Girac
 Matt Pokora
 Tal
 Indila

Germany

Favorite Celebrity
 Revolverheld
 Mario Götze
 Mandy Capristo
 Joko und Klaas

Favorite Videoblogger
 DieLochis
 BibisBeautyPalace
 Dagi Bee
 Sami Slimani

Latin America

Favorite Artist
 Dulce María (Mexico)
 CD9 (Mexico)
 Lali Esposito (Argentina)
 Maluma (Colombia)

Italy

Favorite Singer
 Annalisa
 Dear Jack
 Fedez
 Lorenzo Fragola

Netherlands and Belgium

Favorite Star
  B-Brave (Winner, second time in a row)
 Hardwell
 Ian Thomas
 MainStreet

Poland

Favorite Star
 Dawid Kwiatkowski
 LemON
 Margaret
 Mrozu

Portugal

Favorite Musical Artist
 D.A.M.A
 HMB
 No Stress
 Tom Enzy

Russia

Favorite Sports Star
 Yulia Lipnitskaya

Favorite Actor
 Pavel Priluchny

Favorite Actress
 Anna Khilkevich

Favorite Breakthrough
 MBAND

Favorite Fan Army
 Directioners

Asia
The nominations were revealed on February 24, with the event airing on March 30.

Favorite Asian Act
 JKT48 (Indonesia)
 Jinnyboy (Malaysia)
 Daniel Padilla (Philippines)
 Tosh Zhang (Singapore)

Favorite Chinese Act
 Bibi Zhou (China)
 Qi Wei (China)
 Sean Zhang (China)
 MAYDAY (Taiwan)

United Kingdom
The nominations were announced on February 20, with local awards awarded during continuity with the American ceremony on tape delay 29 March on Nickelodeon. The ceremony was re-transmitted 5 April on Channel 5, which Viacom acquired in 2014, marking the first time the Kids' Choice Awards was transmitted free-to-air in the United Kingdom.

UK Favourite Music Act
 Ed Sheeran
 One Direction
 Little Mix
 Jessie J

UK Favourite Celebrity Animal
 Pudsey the Dog
 Prince Essex
 Pippin & Percy
 Hot Lips

UK Favourite Football Star
 Alexis Sánchez
 Diego Costa
 Wayne Rooney
 Raheem Sterling

UK Favourite Tipster
 Mr. Stampy Cat
 TheDiamondMinecart
 Spencer FC
 Sean Thorne

UK Favourite Breakthrough
 Ella Henderson
 Ella Eyre
 Rixton
 George Ezra

UK Favourite Fan Family
 Directioners
 Swifties
 Vampettes
 Arianators

UK Favourite Vlogger
 Zoella
 Niomi Smart
 Caspar Lee
 Alfie Deyes

Notes

References

External links
 

Nickelodeon Kids' Choice Awards
2015 awards in the United States
2015 in American television
2015 in Los Angeles
2015 television awards
March 2015 events in the United States